Robert Priester (born December 25, 1993) is a professional gridiron football defensive back for the Toronto Argonauts of the Canadian Football League (CFL).

College career
Priester played college football for the Wyoming Cowboys from 2014 to 2017. He played in 36 games where he had 139 tackles, one interception, one sack, three forced fumbles, and three fumble recoveries.

Professional career

Winnipeg Blue Bombers
On May 22, 2018, Priester signed with the Winnipeg Blue Bombers. Following 2018 training camp, he was placed on the team's practice roster, but made his professional debut on September 8, 2018, against the Saskatchewan Roughriders in the Banjo Bowl, where he recorded three defensive tackles. He played in the team's next game against the Montreal Alouettes before returning to the practice roster and ultimately being released on October 16, 2018.

Edmonton Eskimos
After the conclusion of the 2018 CFL season, Priester signed with the Edmonton Eskimos on December 17, 2018. He retired following training camp in 2019, but returned to the team on September 16, 2019, and spent one month on the practice roster before being released on October 21, 2019.

Tampa Bay Vipers
Priester played for his hometown Tampa Bay Vipers in 2020, where he started five games and recorded seven tackles, one sack, and one interception. He had his contract terminated when the league suspended operations on April 10, 2020.

Edmonton Elks
On December 30, 2020, Priester re-signed with the Edmonton Football Team. He was part of the final training camp cuts by the newly-named Elks on July 29, 2021.

Winnipeg Blue Bombers (II)
Priester signed with the Winnipeg Blue Bombers on March 28, 2022. However, he was released before the start of training camp on May 9, 2022.

Toronto Argonauts
On May 21, 2022, Priester was signed by the Toronto Argonauts. Following 2022 training camp, he made the active roster and became the starting cover linebacker while Chris Edwards served a three-game suspension.

References

External links
 Toronto Argonauts bio

1993 births
Living people
American football defensive backs
American players of Canadian football
Canadian football defensive backs
Edmonton Elks players
Players of American football from Tampa, Florida
Players of Canadian football from Tampa, Florida
Tampa Bay Vipers players
Toronto Argonauts players
Winnipeg Blue Bombers players
Wyoming Cowboys football players